Riley Hekure (born 31 October 1994) is a Papua New Guinean cricketer. In September 2019, he was named in Papua New Guinea's One Day International (ODI) squad for the 2019 United States Tri-Nation Series. He made his ODI debut for Papua New Guinea, against Namibia, on 23 September 2019. Prior to his ODI debut, he was named in Papua New Guinea's squad for the 2014 Under-19 Cricket World Cup.

In September 2019, he was named in Papua New Guinea's squad for the 2019 ICC T20 World Cup Qualifier tournament in the United Arab Emirates. He made his Twenty20 International (T20I) debut for Papua New Guinea, against Bermuda, on 19 October 2019.

References

External links
 

1994 births
Living people
Papua New Guinean cricketers
Papua New Guinea One Day International cricketers
Papua New Guinea Twenty20 International cricketers
Place of birth missing (living people)